KMMK (88.7 FM) is a radio station licensed to serve the community of Coggon, Iowa. The station is owned by PLUS Charities, and airs a Catholic radio format.

The station was assigned the KMMK call letters by the Federal Communications Commission on May 15, 2015.

References

External links
 Official Website
 

Radio stations established in 2018
2018 establishments in Iowa
MMK
Linn County, Iowa